Trevor Fletcher (born 30 September 1953) is a former Australian rules footballer who played with Carlton in the Victorian Football League (VFL). 

After retiring from AFL, he became a successful bureaucrat of the New South Wales and Victorian school systems. Hearing about a large high school in rural South Australia in 2011, he quit his city job as Deputy Director General, Schools, for the NSW Department of Education and Training, to become the principal of Eastern Fleurieu School. At the end of 2017, Fletcher retired after successfully leading the school for six years.

Notes

External links 
 
 Trevor Fletcher's profile at Blueseum

1953 births
Carlton Football Club players
South Bendigo Football Club players
Australian rules footballers from Victoria (Australia)
Living people